is the name of a mythical being in the Rigveda,  described as a horse with the epithet áriṣṭa-nemi "with intact wheel-rims" (RV 1.89.6, RV 10.178.1), but alternatively taken to be a bird (RV 5.51) and later identified with Garuda (Mahabharata, Harivamsha) or Garuda's father (Bhagavata Purana 6.6.2, 21), counted among the offspring of Kashyapa in Mahabharata 1.2548, 4830 and 12468.

It is also the name of the hymn RV 10.178 ascribed to Tārkṣya Ariṣṭanemi.

Rigvedic deities